Roommates Wanted (original title: Adopte un veuf meaning Adopt a Widower) is a 2016 French comedy film directed by François Desagnat.

Plot
When you're recently widowed, it is difficult to get used to your new life… This is the case with Hubert Jacquin, who spends most of his time in his huge apartment, feeling depressed, staring at his TV set. One day, after a misunderstanding, his life changes. Manuela, a young and bubbly adventurer in search of an apartment, calls to his home. At first reluctant, Hubert quickly gets used to the presence of this energy storm, who even manages to convince two other people to stay: Paul-Gérard, whose wife has left him, and Marion, a hospital nurse. These three roommates cause Hubert many surprises…

Cast

 André Dussollier as Hubert Jacquin
 Bérengère Krief as Manuela Baudry
 Arnaud Ducret as Paul-Gérard Langlois
 Julia Piaton as Marion Legloux
 Nicolas Marié as Samuel Edlemann
 Blanche Gardin as Rose
 Guillaume Delorme as Sébastien
 Mathieu Madénian as Arnaud
 Vincent Desagnat as Roméro
 Audrey Looten as Valérie
 Panayotis Pascot as Julien

References

External links
 

2016 films
French comedy films
2010s French-language films
2016 comedy films
Films directed by François Desagnat
2010s French films